"The Adventure of the Cardboard Box" is one of the 56 short Sherlock Holmes stories written by Sir Arthur Conan Doyle. The story was first published in The Strand Magazine in the United Kingdom in January 1893, and in Harper's Weekly in the United States on 14 January 1893. It is the second of twelve stories collected in The Memoirs of Sherlock Holmes in most British editions of the canon, and the second of the eight stories from His Last Bow in most American versions.

Synopsis
Miss Susan Cushing of Croydon receives a parcel in the post that contains two severed human ears packed in coarse salt. Inspector Lestrade of Scotland Yard suspects a prank by three medical students whom Miss Cushing was forced to evict because of their unruly behaviour. The parcel was sent from Belfast, the city of origin of one of the former boarders. Upon examining the parcel himself, Holmes is convinced that it is evidence of a serious crime. He reasons that a medical student with access to a dissection laboratory would likely use something other than plain salt to preserve human remains, and would be able to make a more precise cut than the roughly hacked ears suggest. The address on the package, roughly written and with a spelling correction, suggests to Holmes that the sender lacks education and is unfamiliar with Croydon. The knot in the string suggests to Holmes that they are looking for someone with sailing experience.

Holmes considers the solution so simple that he asks Lestrade not to mention his name in connection with it. A few simple questions to Miss Cushing, a few observations, a cable to Liverpool, and a visit to Miss Cushing's sister Sarah (Holmes was denied admittance by the doctor because she was having a "brain fever") convince Holmes that the ears belong to Miss Cushing's other sister, Mary, and her extramarital lover, and that they have been murdered. He is convinced that Mary's estranged husband, Jim Browner, is the murderer, and that Browner had sent the cardboard box containing the ears to the Cushings' house in Croydon (addressing it merely to "S. Cushing"), not realizing that Sarah was no longer resident there. Browner, who is an unpleasant man when drunk, had meant to horrify Sarah (rather than Susan) because he ultimately blamed Sarah for causing the trouble that culminated in his murder of his wife and her lover.

Browner is indeed a sailor, and Belfast was the first port where he had the chance to post the parcel. Lestrade, acting on Holmes's information, is waiting to arrest him when his ship reaches London. He confesses everything. He is presented with considerable sympathy, a simple man so tormented by guilt at his act that he would welcome being hanged. The real villain of the story—morally if not legally—is Sarah Cushing, who fell in love with and tried to seduce Browner herself; then, when he rejected her advances, set out to wreck his marriage with her sister Mary, by poisoning her mind to her own husband and by introducing and pushing her onto a new lover, which she easily took to, especially given her husband's propensity for getting drunk (and being rather rough when so intoxicated). In the end, her husband's inability to accept her betrayal, and sheer jealousy at discovering the affair, causes him to commit what Holmes considers a "crime of passion".

Publication history

The story was published in the UK in The Strand Magazine in January 1893, and in the US in Harper's Weekly on 14 January 1893. It was also published in the US edition of the Strand in February 1893. In The Strand Magazine, the story included eight illustrations by Sidney Paget. It did not include any illustrations in Harper's Weekly.

"The Adventure of the Cardboard Box" was not published in the first British edition of The Memoirs of Sherlock Holmes, but it was published in the first American edition, though it was quickly removed because of its controversial subject matter.  The story was later published again in 1917 in His Last Bow.  Even today, most American editions of the canon include it with His Last Bow, while most British editions keep the story in its original place, within the Memoirs.

When "The Adventure of the Cardboard Box" was removed from publication, Conan Doyle moved a passage from it that showed Holmes "mind reading" Watson to "The Adventure of the Resident Patient". (The text of the moved passage runs from "Our blinds were half-drawn, and  Holmes lay curled upon the sofa" to "I should not have intruded it upon your attention had you not shown some incredulity the other day.") This passage reveals Dr. Watson to be an avid admirer of Henry Ward Beecher, whose portrait he keeps at his home. The passage seems to have little to do with the mystery but may be a subtle reference to the theme of adultery as Beecher was famously put on trial for the offense in 1875, an event many contemporary readers would have remembered.

Adaptations

Film and television
The story was adapted as a short silent film titled The Cardboard Box in 1923, as one of the short films in the Sherlock Holmes film series by Stoll Pictures. It starred Eille Norwood as Sherlock Holmes and Hubert Willis as Dr. Watson. Hilda Anthony played Mary Browner and Johnny Butt played James Browner.

The Granada TV adaptation with Jeremy Brett, televised on 11 April 1994, was generally faithful to the original. It contained some minor variations: in the story Browner kills his wife and her lover at sea whereas in the adaptation he kills them near a pond; and the adaptation places the action at Christmas time in the midst of a cold and snowy winter, while the original story took place in high summer ("...a blazing hot day in August. Baker Street was like an oven"). Holmes's eloquent speech at the end of the episode questions the very nature of humanity. He asks toward what end mortals pursue "this circle of misery, violence, and fear", concluding that "it must have a purpose, or else our universe has no meaning, which is unthinkable. But what purpose? That is humanity's great problem, to which reason, so far, has no answer."  This was the last episode broadcast, and includes Brett in ill health at the end of his run as the famous detective.  Ciaran Hinds played the role of Jim Browner.

The Elementary episode "Ears to You" is a loose adaptation of this story. The setup for this episode is very similar to that story—two human ears are mailed to someone, packed in salt—but includes several variations, including the twist that the ears were actually sent by the supposed victim, who underwent a complex experiment to literally grow fake ears on her back so as to frame the primary suspect for her murder.

The 2018 HBO Asia/Hulu Japan series Miss Sherlock loosely adapts this story as the episode "Stella Maris." As the series is set in Tokyo, the misleading address on the box containing the ear in the original story is adapted as a mailing label with unclearly written katakana.

Radio
The story was adapted by Edith Meiser as an episode of the radio series The Adventures of Sherlock Holmes. The episode, which aired on 5 November 1931, featured Richard Gordon as Sherlock Holmes and Leigh Lovell as Dr. Watson. Another production of the story aired in September 1936, with Gordon as Holmes and Harry West as Watson.

Meiser also adapted the story for The New Adventures of Sherlock Holmes for episodes that aired in January 1940 and August 1943 with Basil Rathbone playing Holmes and Nigel Bruce playing Watson.

The story was adapted for the BBC Light Programme in 1960 by Michael Hardwick, as part of the 1952–1969 radio series starring Carleton Hobbs as Holmes and Norman Shelley as Watson.

"The Cardboard Box" was dramatised by Roger Danes for BBC Radio 4 in 1994 as an episode of the 1989–1998 radio series starring Clive Merrison as Holmes and Michael Williams as Watson (in the series for His Last Bow). It featured Kevin Whately as Browner and Teresa Gallagher as Mary Browner; it also introduced Stephen Thorne as Inspector Lestrade, who had previously been played by Donald Gee.

In 2010, the story was adapted as an episode of the radio series The Classic Adventures of Sherlock Holmes, with John Patrick Lowrie as Holmes and Lawrence Albert as Watson.

In 2020, the story was adapted in Bengali language by Indian radio channel radio mirchi. The adaptation was very well received by the Bengali audience.

References
Notes

Sources

External links

 

1893 short stories
Cardboard Box, The
Works originally published in The Strand Magazine
Works originally published in Harper's Weekly